William Thomas Moxon (2 February 1885 – 23 June 1952) was an Australian rules footballer who played with Fitzroy in the Victorian Football League (VFL).

Notes

External links 

1885 births
1952 deaths
Australian rules footballers from Victoria (Australia)
Fitzroy Football Club players